Eric Schneider (born September 15, 1977) is a Canadian professional ice hockey player. He currently plays in the semi-professional Chinook Hockey League with the Bentley Generals. He last played professionally in the top German tier with Adler Mannheim of the Deutsche Eishockey Liga (DEL).

During the 2002–03 CHL season, Schneider represented the Laredo Bucks in the CHL All-Star game.

Career statistics

Awards and honours

References

External links

1977 births
Living people
Adler Mannheim players
SC Bietigheim-Bissingen players
Canadian ice hockey forwards
Cleveland Barons (2001–2006) players
Detroit Vipers players
EHC München players
ETC Crimmitschau players
Frankfurt Lions players
Hamburg Freezers players
Hannover Scorpions players
Johnstown Chiefs players
Kansas City Blades players
Knoxville Speed players
Laredo Bucks players
Las Vegas Wranglers players
Powell River Kings players
Rochester Americans players
Saint John Flames players
San Antonio Rampage players
Ice hockey people from Calgary
Tri-City Americans players
Utah Grizzlies (AHL) players
Canadian expatriate ice hockey players in Germany
Canadian expatriate ice hockey players in the United States